Iranian Football Association Australia is an Australian football (soccer) club from Sydney that represents the Iranian community in Australia.

History
IFAA was established in August 2014 in Sydney and promotes football and futsal in Australia.

References

External links
 Official website

2014 establishments in Australia
Association football clubs established in 2014
New South Wales Premier League teams
Soccer clubs in Sydney
Iranian association football clubs outside Iran
Iranian-Australian organizations
Diaspora sports clubs in Australia
Futsal clubs in Australia

Iranian-Australian culture